Nakson is a mountain in Krasnoyarsk Krai, Russia. At  is the highest mountain in the Syverma Plateau, part of the Central Siberian Plateau.

See also
List of mountains in Russia

References

External links
The highest peaks in Russia

Nakson